The Lake Drolet (in French: lac Drolet) is a lake located near the village of Lac-Drolet, in Le Granit Regional County Municipality, in Estrie, in Quebec, Canada. It is the source of the Drolet River, a tributary of the Chaudière River and a sub-tributary of the St. Lawrence River.

Geography 

Its area is 708 acres, its elevation is 457 meters, and its maximum depth is 8 meters. The species of fish are; rainbow trout, brown trout and walleye. The name evokes a surveyor from Saint-Sébastien who would go fishing on the frozen lake in winter.

Tourism 
Located near the Route des Sommets, in an environment where nature and mountains are omnipresent, the area is ideal for hiking, camping, and outdoor activities.

References

External links 
 
 Association des riverains du lac Drolet 

Lakes of Estrie
Le Granit Regional County Municipality